Welch is a city located in McDowell County in the State of West Virginia, United States. The population was 3,590 at the 2020 census, however the 2021 census estimate put the population at 1,914, due to the McDowell Prison complex in the northeast splitting from the city of Welch as part of unincorporated McDowell County. Incorporated as a city in 1893, it is the county seat of McDowell County.

History
Welch was incorporated in 1893 and named after Isaiah A. Welch, a former captain in the Confederate States Army who came to the region as a surveyor, and helped establish the plan for the beginning of a new town at the confluence of Tug Fork and Elkhorn Creek.

Welch was made the county seat of McDowell County in an election by county citizens in 1892 even before Welch was incorporated as a city. The previous county seat was in Perryville (now English) on present day West Virginia Route 83 along the Dry Fork. Results of the election were contested, so to avoid violence county records were secretly moved from Perryville to Welch at night in two wagons by James A. Strother and Trigg Tabor. 

On March 2, 1921, the Welch City Council met to discuss impeachment of then Mayor J. H. Whitt. Whitt showed up at the meeting and disrupted the proceedings. The Welch City Council then asked the McDowell Co. Sheriff's Dept. to investigate Whitt. Later that same day, Mayor Whitt shot and killed McDowell County Deputy Sheriff William Johnson Tabor who was investigating the matter. Mayor Whitt was arrested and charged with murder but won acquittal at his trial (allegedly based on perjured testimony). Whitt left the area for parts unknown on September 27, 1921.

On August 1, 1921, detectives from the Baldwin–Felts Detective Agency assassinated Matewan Police Chief Sid Hatfield as well as Ed Chambers at the McDowell County Courthouse located in Welch.

In the first half of the 20th century during the opening of railroads and coal mines throughout the region, Welch became a prosperous city: the hub of retail business for a county approaching 100,000 in population, and the location for three hospitals. After the production boom of World War II, oil began to supplant coal in many areas of domestic fuel supply. Mechanization of coal mining reduced the number of laborers needed in coal production. McDowell County's population peaked in 1950, and began a decline over decades to follow. In 1960, however, McDowell County still ranked number one in the United States in total coal production. The City of Welch proudly proclaimed itself "The Heart of the Nation's Coal Bin".

When presidential candidate John F. Kennedy visited Welch by automobile caravan in 1960, he saw a city whose businesses were struggling due to a growing poverty rate throughout the county. What Kennedy learned here during his campaign for the 1960 West Virginia primary was believed to be the basis of the aid brought to the Appalachian region by the Kennedy and Lyndon Johnson administrations. During a speech in Canton, Ohio on September 27, 1960, he stated "McDowell County mines more coal than it ever has in its history, probably more coal than any county in the United States and yet there are more people getting surplus food packages in McDowell County than any county in the United States. The reason is that machines are doing the jobs of men, and we have not been able to find jobs for those men."

The first recipients of modern era food stamps were the Chloe and Alderson Muncy family of Paynesville, McDowell County. Their household included fifteen persons. On May 29, 1961, in the City of Welch, as a crowd of reporters witnessed the proceedings, Secretary of Agriculture Orville Freeman delivered $95 of federal food stamps to Mr. and Mrs. Muncy. This was the first issuance of federal food stamps under the Kennedy Administration, and it was the beginning of a rapidly expanding program of federal assistance that would be legislated in the "War on Poverty".

In the 1960s and 1970s, McDowell County coal continued to be a major source of fuel for the steel and electric power generation industries. As United States steel production declined, however, McDowell County suffered further losses. In 1986, the closure of the US Steel mines in nearby Gary led to an immediate loss of more than 1,200 jobs. In the following year alone, personal income in McDowell County decreased dramatically by two-thirds. Real estate values also plummeted. Miners were forced to abandon their homes in search for new beginnings in other regions of the country.

In 2006, the city received national attention when it, along with Police Chief Robert K. Bowman were the defendants in a lawsuit brought by the ACLU after Bowman allegedly prevented rescuers from providing CPR to a gay man suffering cardiac arrest.  After the wrongful death claim was allowed to proceed, the lawsuit was settled for an undetermined amount.

In recent years, Welch has attracted the construction of new state and federal prisons which are creating some sources of economic renewal. The city has begun restoration of its historic downtown area.

Welch has been the celebrated location of an annual Veterans Day Parade which over the decades has attracted a distinguished list of speakers, including Presidents Harry S. Truman and Lyndon B. Johnson.

The McDowell County Courthouse and Welch Commercial Historic District are listed on the National Register of Historic Places.

Firsts

The first public children's playground in West Virginia was built in Welch in 1913.  It was constructed using private donations and after 1918 was maintained by the Young Women's Missionary Society of the Methodist Church.  The playground sat across the street from the McDowell County Courthouse until 1930 when it became the site for the United States Post Office.

Welch was the location of the first memorial building in the United States dedicated to the memory of U.S. servicemen killed in World War I, and to honor the veterans of that war. It was dedicated on May 30, 1923.  The building was destroyed by fire.  The historic site is now an empty lot near the county courthouse.

In 1928, Welch resident Minnie Buckingham Harper became the first black woman legislator in the United States. Harper was appointed by the Governor to the West Virginia House of Delegates to fill the vacancy caused by the death of her husband.

Welch also built the first municipally owned parking building in the United States, which was opened September 1, 1941. It accommodated 232 cars and showed a profit its first year in operation.

Geography

Periodic flooding of the Elkhorn and Tug Fork rivers has plagued the future prosperity of the city. Most notably, the record flooding in 2001 and 2002 nearly destroyed Welch altogether. Flood reduction projects to prevent further destruction in the future are presently in progress.

The town has a railway station on the Norfolk Southern Railway (former Norfolk and Western) network.

Demographics

2020 census

As of the 2020 United States census, there were 3,590 people, 844 households, and 517 families residing in the city.

2010 census
As of the census of 2010, there were 2,406 people, 984 households, and 554 families living in the city. The racial makeup of the city was 84.5% White, 13.3% African American, 0.1% Native American, 0.1% Asian, and 2.0% from two or more races. Hispanic or Latino of any race were 0.7% of the population.

There were 984 households, of which 22.4% had children under the age of 18 living with them, 38.7% were married couples living together, 13.2% had a female householder with no husband present, 4.4% had a male householder with no wife present, and 43.7% were non-families. 39.3% of all households were made up of individuals, and 17.4% had someone living alone who was 65 years of age or older. The average household size was 2.11 and the average family size was 2.78.

The median age in the city was 44 years. 15.5% of residents were under the age of 18; 7.9% were between the ages of 18 and 24; 27.9% were from 25 to 44; 30.9% were from 45 to 64; and 17.8% were 65 years of age or older. The gender makeup of the city was 53.4% male and 46.6% female.

2000 census
As of the census of 2000, there were 2,683 people, 1,195 households, and 714 families living in the city. The population density was 821.1 people per square mile (316.8/km2). There were 1,453 housing units at an average density of 444.7 per square mile (171.6/km2). The racial makeup of the city was 79.20% White, 19.27% African American, 0.26% Native American, 0.30% Asian, 0.34% from other races, and 0.63% from two or more races. Hispanic or Latino of any race were 1.04% of the population.

There were 1,195 households, out of which 22.7% had children under the age of 18 living with them, 39.2% were married couples living together, 17.2% had a female householder with no husband present, and 40.2% were non-families. 37.6% of all households were made up of individuals, and 17.6% had someone living alone who was 65 years of age or older. The average household size was 2.12 and the average family size was 2.76.

In the city, the population was spread out, with 19.3% under the age of 18, 6.6% from 18 to 24, 24.7% from 25 to 44, 26.7% from 45 to 64, and 22.5% who were 65 years of age or older. The median age was 45 years. For every 100 females, there were 81.7 males. For every 100 females age 18 and over, there were 80.0 males.

The median income for a household in the city was $19,795, and the median income for a family was $30,833. Males had a median income of $30,104 versus $23,320 for females. The per capita income for the city was $16,308. About 23.0% of families and 28.9% of the population were below the poverty line, including 45.9% of those under age 18 and 16.7% of those age 65 or over.

Transportation

Highways

Media
Welch is served by The Welch News, a local newspaper that currently runs on Monday, Wednesday and Friday.

Notable people
The following were born in or at some point in their lives resided in Welch:
 Karen Austin, actress
 Harry J. Capehart, lawyer, politician, and businessperson
 Sue Cline, West Virginia State Senator and businessperson
 Steve Harvey, comedian, actor, entertainer; born in Welch. He is currently host of television's Family Feud and Little Big Shots.
 Alex Hawkins, NFL running back and sports broadcaster; born in Welch
 Kermit Hunter, playwright and musician, author of Unto These Hills, Horn of the West and Honey in the Rock
 Jackson L. Kiser, United States District Court judge
 Jeannette Walls, author of The Glass Castle, of which a portion takes place in Welch
 John Wockenfuss,  Major League Baseball player from 1974 to 1985

References

External links

 USAToday.com Story on Pending Lawsuit against the City and Bowman

Cities in West Virginia
Cities in McDowell County, West Virginia
County seats in West Virginia
Populated places established in 1893
1893 establishments in West Virginia